The hingemouth (Phractolaemus ansorgii) is a small freshwater fish that is found only in west central Africa, the sole member of the subfamily Phractolaeminae of the family Kneriidae.

The mouth can extend like a small trunk, thus the name, and has just two teeth, both in the lower jaw. The swim bladder has two compartments, and can function as a lung, allowing the hingemouth to survive in oxygen-poor environments.

References

 
 
 

Kneriidae
Fish described in 1901
Taxa named by George Albert Boulenger
Freshwater fish of Africa